White Dog is a Canadian drama film, directed by Anaïs Barbeau-Lavalette and released in 2022. Adapted from Romain Gary's autobiographical novel White Dog, the film stars Denis Ménochet as Gary and Kacey Rohl as his wife Jean Seberg, and centres on their adoption of an abandoned dog whom they learn to their horror had been trained to attack Black people on sight, leading them to send him to Keys (K. C. Collins), a Black dog trainer, for retraining.

It is the second film adaptation of Gary's book, following White Dog in 1982. Unlike the first film adaptation, in which director Samuel Fuller entirely wrote out the character of Gary, replaced Seberg with a younger fictional actress and recast the story as a horror film centred on the dog itself, Barbeau-Lavalette remained more faithful to the original book. Additionally, given the context of a film centred on the responses of white characters to anti-Black racism based on a decades-old book, she hired Black filmmakers Maryse Legagneur and Will Prosper as script consultants to ensure that the screenplay was respectful and sensitive to Black perspectives.

The film premiered on November 2, 2022 as the opening film of the Cinemania film festival, and opened in commercial release on November 9.

References

External links
 

2020s Canadian films
2022 films
2022 drama films
Canadian drama films
English-language Canadian films
French-language Canadian films
Civil rights movement in film
Films about dogs
Films about racism
Films about the Black Panther Party
Films based on French novels
Films directed by Anaïs Barbeau-Lavalette
Films set in 1968
Films set in Alabama
Films set in Los Angeles
Films set in Paris
Quebec films